Lovas is an old and frequent Hungarian family name, meaning "horseback rider". Norwegian and French families also use this title.

Lovas may refer to:

Places 
 Lovas, Croatia
 Lovas, Hungary
 Lovaș, a tributary of the river Ciobănuș in Harghita County, Romania

People 
 Antal Lovas (1884–?), Hungarian long-distance runner
 Miklós Lovas (born 1931), a Hungarian discoverer of minor planets and comets
 Petra Lovas (born 1980), Hungarian table tennis player
 Phil Lovas (born c. 1968), American politician

Astronomy 
 93P/Lovas, a comet discovered by Miklós Lovas

See also 
 Lova (disambiguation)
 Ole Ivar Lovaas (1927–2010), Norwegian-American clinical psychologist